East Lancs may refer to:
East Lancashire Coachbuilders, a Blackburn-based manufacturer of bus bodywork
East Lancashire Cricket Club, a cricket club in the Lancashire League
East Lancashire Railway, a heritage railway line between Bury and Rawtenstall
East Lancashire Railway 1844–1859, a 19th-century railway company in Lancashire, England
East Lancashire Road, a primary A road between Liverpool and Manchester